Héctor Arturo Sanhueza Medel (born 11 March 1979), known as Arturo Sanhueza, is a Chilean former professional footballer who played as a midfielder.

Club career
Born in Concepción, Bío-Bío Region, Sanhueza started his career at hometown club Fernández Vial before moving to Everton, where he would spend an entire season. After Vina del Mar team's relegation, he moved to crosstown rivals Santiago Wanderers, led by Jorge Garcés, where he helped to win the 2001 league title.

Following three seasons at Valparaíso-based team, in 2005, he signed for Chilean powerhouse Colo-Colo after rejecting an offer from Mexico's Atlante. Nevertheless, with Claudio Borghi arrival to the bench, Sanhueza became an undisputed player in the Apertura and Clausura titles as well as in the Copa Sudamericana which Colo-Colo was runner-up.

In December 2006, he was heavily linked with Argentinian giants Boca Juniors which wanted to sign him for replace Fernando Gago, who left Boca for Real Madrid.

After another four seasons playing for Colo-Colo where he won four league titles as captain, in December 2010 he wasn't considered by coach Diego Cagna and the club held a farewell for him during a press conference.

In 2011 Sanhueza moved to Deportes Iquique, freshly promoted to the top division after failing to join Chinese Super League side Changchun Yatai F.C., being only 20 days in this country. Following a season and half, in June 2012 he signed for Universidad de Concepción.  However, after only six months playing, in December he announced his retirement from football.

On 8 January 2013, Sanhueza reversed his decision to retire and joined Primera B club Deportes Temuco. Three years later he, as captain, achieved the 2015–16 second-tier title and thereby the promotion to Primera División. Nevertheless he left Temuco and joined Cobreloa, Chilean powerhouse team which lost the category in 2015 and failed to achieve the promotion to first-tier.

At the end of 2022 season, he retired from the football activity as a professional player after a twenty-five-year career.

Honours

Club
Santiago Wanderers
 Primera División: 2001

Colo-Colo
 Primera División (6): 2006-A, 2006-C, 2007-A, 2007-C, 2008-C, 2009-C
 Copa Sudamericana: Runner–up 2006

Deportes Temuco
 Primera B: 2015–16

Individual
 Campeonato Nacional Team of the Season (3): 2006, 2007, 2008

References

External links
 Arturo Sanhueza at Football-Lineups
 
 

1979 births
Living people
Sportspeople from Concepción, Chile
Chilean footballers
Chilean expatriate footballers
Chile international footballers
2007 Copa América players
Chilean Primera División players
Primera B de Chile players
Segunda División Profesional de Chile players
C.D. Arturo Fernández Vial footballers
Everton de Viña del Mar footballers
Santiago Wanderers footballers
Colo-Colo footballers
Changchun Yatai F.C. players
Deportes Iquique footballers
Universidad de Concepción footballers
Deportes Temuco footballers
Cobreloa footballers
Chilean expatriate sportspeople in China
Expatriate footballers in China
Association football midfielders